The Aftermath Clubhouse is a two-story, wood-frame Italian Villa building which was originally constructed in 1904. It is estimated to be the first women's clubhouse in the state of Washington.

History
The Aftermath Reading Circle first formed in 1895, as a literary and social club for women of New Whatcom. The organization encouraged socialization, intellectual discussion and became a means for participating in community affairs. Once the informal reading Circle transformed into the formal Aftermath Club, the members took it upon themselves to raise funds to purchase property and build a permanent clubhouse. Designed by local architect Frank C. Burns, construction on the clubhouse began in October 1904 and it was officially dedicated on April 24, 1905 with a grand reception. For many years in Whatcom County it was the only clubhouse owned by its members. As a testament to their success, the Aftermath Club managed to pay off the debt of their clubhouse while continuing their charitable and philanthropic ventures.

Today
The Clubhouse is still privately owned and is rented out for events. For years, the second floor was considered to be one of the best ballrooms in the area.

References

External links
 www.cob.org.
 www.nationalregisterofhistoricplaces.com.

Buildings and structures in Bellingham, Washington
Clubhouses on the National Register of Historic Places in Washington (state)
Women in Washington (state)
Women's club buildings
Buildings and structures completed in 1905
National Register of Historic Places in Whatcom County, Washington